Construction of the first Austrian nuclear power plant in Zwentendorf on the Danube, about 30 kilometres upstream from the capital, Vienna, began in 1972. Zwentendorf Nuclear Power Plant was designed as a boiling water reactor with a capacity of 700 MW(e), that was expected to generate about 10% of the Austrian electricity production.

Many groups in the public society stood up against this commercial-technical development. From heritage and family-oriented more conservative people to utopian-driven leftists, activists for nature and the environment to critical technicians. They organised in a platform called "IÖAG - Initiative österreichischer Atomkraftwerksgegner" (transliterated: IOeAG), edited a simple DIN A5 brochure "Wie ist das mit den Atomkraftwerken wirklich?" (What is it about the nuclear power plants, really?) and an in volume and circulation growing newspaper, both financed by private members and a selling price. Many activists organised in groups, presented information desks, spoke to passing people visited and contributed offensive to official information events.

However, in June 1978, the Socialist Chancellor Dr. Kreisky, announced a referendum on nuclear power, which was set down for November 5, 1978. The referendum resulted in a narrow majority against the Zwentendorf plant. Nearly two thirds of the voters (3.26 million people) went to the polls and of these 49.5% voted for, and 50.5% against, nuclear power.

Newspapers did not write much about accidents, that already had happened until then. But Verbundkonzern - owning the big water power plants (and the grid) in Austria - feared a lowering of the price of electricity by the upcoming of nuclear power and started an advertising campaign in the months before the referendum in "Kronenzeitung". Suddenly this wide circulated newspaper published a series about the history and the accidents of nuclear power.

The Zwentendorf plant was completed but has never produced electricity from nuclear energy.

Austrian Chancellor Werner Faymann expects anti-nuclear petition drives to start in at least six European Union countries in 2012 with the goal of having the EU abandon nuclear power. Under the EU's Lisbon Treaty, petitions that attract at least one million signatures can seek legislative proposals from the European Commission. This would pave the way for anti-nuclear activists to increase support.

Resources 
Kein Kernkraftwerk in Zwentendorf! - 30 Jahre danach (No nuclear power plant in Zwentendorf! - 30 years after) Museum Joanneum Graz, exhibition 01.11.2008-30.01.2009 and book by Sigrid Schönfelder for CLIO and Büro der Erinnerungen, German, visited 23.05.2014
Kernkraftwerk in Zwentendorf! - 30 Jahre Zwentendorf KulturServer Graz, German, visited 23.05.2014
Das wichtigste NEIN unseres Lebens - AKW-ABSTIMMUNG Zwentendorf Source: Österreichische Mediathek, Online archive, article about the history and some historic audio documents, German, visited 23.05.2014
Akustische Chronik 1977-1978 Source: Österreichische Mediathek, Online Archive, German, visited 23.05.2014
30 Jahre Zwentendorf: Ausstellung in Graz Exhibition announcement - Kleine Zeitung, 31.10.2008, German, visited 23.05.2014

See also

The Greens – The Green Alternative
Hildegard Breiner
Robert Jungk
Freda Meissner-Blau
Energy in Austria
Nuclear power phase-out
Viki Weisskopf

References

 
Politics of Austria
Nuclear power in Austria
Protests in Austria
Environmentalism in Austria
Peace movement in Austria